The Ontario County Courthouse is located in Canandaigua, New York, United States. The United States v. Susan B. Anthony trial took place in this courthouse in 1873. It is a contributing property to the Canandaigua Historic District, listed on the National Register of Historic Places in 1984.

References

External links

Courthouses in New York (state)
Historic district contributing properties in New York (state)
Buildings and structures in Ontario County, New York
Government buildings completed in 1858
Canandaigua, New York
National Register of Historic Places in Ontario County, New York
Courthouses on the National Register of Historic Places in New York (state)